"L.I.P (Local Indigenous Personnel)" was the 31st episode of the M*A*S*H television series, and seventh of season two. The episode first aired on October 27, 1973.

Plot
Hawkeye is at the movies with his date, Regina, a nurse, but after the movie she brings the date to a swift end with a handshake.  Back at the Swamp, he is called to take a look at the sick baby of a US soldier, who reveals he is being shipped home soon and that he and the baby's Korean mother are not officially married, and asks Hawkeye for help in clearing through Army red tape so they can be married.

Meanwhile, Hawkeye and Regina embark on another date, finally sharing a kiss.  However, a third date is postponed when an officer from the Criminal Investigation Division (CID) arrives to interview Hawkeye as a character witness for the soldier's marriage application.  Hawkeye and Trapper decide to blackmail the CID officer to ensure a favourable outcome.  When Hawkeye is finally free to see Regina and explains the events of the evening, she voices her opposition to interracial marriage, at which point Hawkeye ends their date and leaves.

At the end of the episode, the baby's parents are married in a ceremony officiated by Father Mulcahy.

External links

M*A*S*H (season 2) episodes
1973 American television episodes
Television episodes directed by William Wiard